Stephen Thomas Adams (born 18 June 1958) is an English former professional footballer who played in the Football League as a midfielder.

References
General
 . Retrieved 28 October 2013.
Specific

1958 births
Living people
Sportspeople from Windsor, Berkshire
English footballers
Association football midfielders
Queens Park Rangers F.C. players
Millwall F.C. players
Cambridge United F.C. players
Hillingdon Borough F.C. players
English Football League players
Footballers from Berkshire